Robert Edward Kelly is a fictional character appearing in American comic books published by Marvel Comics. He most often appears in Marvel's X-Men related comic books. He is a prominent United States Senator who began his career on an anti-mutant platform and tended to be an antagonist to the X-Men team. But towards the later days of his career, he began to change his views on mutants as a whole.

Publication history
The character was created by Chris Claremont and John Byrne and makes his first appearance in The Uncanny X-Men #135 (July 1980).

Fictional character biography
Senator Robert Kelly was first seen at a social gathering hosted by the Hellfire Club, where an illusion projected by the mutant villain Mastermind caused him to believe he had witnessed the X-Man Cyclops firing randomly into a crowd. He was the primary backer of the Mutant Control Act and Project Wideawake, a government program aimed at creating updated Sentinel robots that would help track down, detain and, if necessary, kill violent mutants.

Senator Kelly played a central role in the Days of Future Past storyline. The entire plot revolved around the X-Men stopping Mystique and the Brotherhood of Mutants from assassinating him and thus inadvertently causing a dystopian future where mutants and other heroes were hunted down by the Sentinels and nearly totally eliminated.

Senator Kelly was later married to Sharon, a former maid who worked in the Hellfire Club. Kelly, in a meeting with Sebastian Shaw, was shocked when his wife walked in wearing her old servant garb as a bit of fun. Sharon was genuinely apologetic, saying she would not have done such a thing if it hadn't been just him and Shaw. Sharon was killed, shot by Master Mold during a battle between the mutant-hunting robot and Rogue. This further incited Robert's stance against mutantkind.

Senator Kelly remained an active anti-mutant activist in the comics through the 1990s, but slowly became more open-minded and tolerant towards the mutant population, promising the X-Men he would work for the rights of mutants during the early 2000s. After his life was saved by the mutant Pyro in an attack (this was when Pyro was infected with the Legacy Virus) from Post, Kelly vowed to reconsider his standing on mutants and work towards improving human/mutant relations. Despite being guarded by the X-Man Cable, he was not long afterward assassinated at a college rally (where he was speaking at the time) by the anti-mutant activist Alan Lewis who felt that Kelly betrayed their anti-mutant cause. He died in Cable's arms after Cable had been too occupied helping Jean Grey save Charles Xavier on the astral plane to realize the danger to Kelly before it was too late. With his dying breaths, he pleaded for Cable not to give up on his dream. Cable's failure to protect the reformed Kelly, coupled with the devastating loss of Moira MacTaggert who was murdered by Mystique, led Cable to leave the X-Men not long afterward.

The Box prison for mutant criminals was also known as the Robert Kelly Correction Facility where it was named in honor of him.

Creation
The character's name was chosen by Chris Claremont, in honor of his Bard College professor, the poet Robert Kelly. The latter has confirmed the connection between the two names in interviews among his students.

Other versions

Age of Apocalypse
In the Age of Apocalypse, Robert Kelly was an activist for mutant-human peace who is eventually elected President of the United States. He named Magneto as Director of Mutant Affairs and enlisted the X-Men's aid in the broken country's reconstruction.

X-Men: Noir
In the X-Men Noir reality, Robert Kelly was a Republican Senator of New York who strongly defended the controversial U.S. extraterritorial prison Genosha Bay. Kelly believed through eugenics that it is necessary for containing criminals who are more exceptionally dangerous and from "infecting" the public with their criminal ways. However, in reality, Kelly's true purpose of keeping Genosha Bay was because it was the proving grounds in recruiting the next generation of ideal soldiers and government operatives.

Secret Wars
During the "Secret Wars" storyline, a version of Robert Kelly existed as the appointed Baron of the Battleworld domain known as Westchester. Kelly survived an assassination attempt by the Shadow King whom possessed Cassandra Nova (revealed to be a clone of Charles Xavier created by Apocalypse) and despite being a merely "human" and remaining publicly favorable to the X-Men, Baron Kelly was secretly one of the Horsemen of Apocalypse along with Bastion, Mystique and Exodus. He was last seen meeting with Apocalypse to plan the future for Westchester.

In other media

Television

 Senator Robert Jefferson Kelly appears in X-Men: The Animated Series, voiced by Len Carlson. He initially runs for President of the United States on an anti-mutant campaign until he gradually changes his mind following failed assassination attempts by Mystique disguised as Gambit and nearly being brainwashed by Master Mold before being rescued by the X-Men, whom he befriends. Upon winning the election and taking office, Kelly publicly supports mutants and pardons Beast as his first presidential act. Following this, Kelly makes minor appearances in subsequent seasons as an ally of the X-Men.
 A variation of Robert Kelly named Edward Kelly appears in X-Men: Evolution, voiced by Dale Wilson. This version is the principal of Bayville High, which several X-Men and the Brotherhood of Bayville attend, following his predecessor Raven Darkholme's disappearance. After the X-Men's identities are publicly revealed, Kelly attempts to vote them out of school, but the school board vote against him after the X-Men save them from the Brotherhood. Kelly subsequently expels the Brotherhood and runs for mayor.
 Senator Robert Kelly appears in Wolverine and the X-Men, voiced by Richard Doyle. This version supports various anti-mutant projects, such as Bolivar Trask's Sentinel program and the Mutant Response Division (MRD), and arranged a deal with Magneto that involved the latter receiving Genosha. After Magneto closes Genosha's borders, Kelly sends Gambit to steal Magneto's helmet and cripple the nation, though Gambit only succeeds in the latter task. Magneto attempts to seek revenge, but Professor X intervenes by showing Magneto and Kelly the possible dystopian future that will take place if they continue on their current path. Shocked by this, Kelly shuts down Sentinel production, but an undeterred Magneto has Quicksilver capture him so Mystique can take his place and help him incite a war between mutants and humanity.
 Senator Robert Kelly appears in the Iron Man: Armored Adventures episode "The X-Factor", voiced again by Dale Wilson. This version sports a beard and rabidly speaks out against mutants.

Film
 Senator Robert Kelly appears in X-Men (2000), portrayed by Bruce Davison. This version is a Republican from Kansas whose daughter is a mutant. He is kidnapped by the Brotherhood of Mutants and used as a test subject for Magneto's plan to convert humans into mutants. Kelly is transformed into a jellyfish-like mutant with stretching capabilities, but the process proves fatal due to his body rejecting the changes. The X-Men later recover Kelly, who learns to accept that some mutants are not against humanity before liquefying while Mystique takes his place to avoid arousing suspicions.
 Mystique disguised as Senator Robert Kelly appears in X2 (2003), portrayed again by Bruce Davison.

Video games
 Senator Robert Kelly appears in Marvel: Ultimate Alliance, voiced by Peter Renaday. This version harbors a general distrust of superhumans in addition to mutants. After being captured by Arcade and imprisoned in Murderworld, players have the option of saving him in a side mission. If he is found and rescued, Kelly will support a Mutant Aid Bill, which will allow government funding for schools dedicated to training young mutants in how to control their powers. If not, he frees himself and successfully sponsors a bill where all mutants are sent to re-education camps, where they are brutally educated in not using their powers.
 Senator Robert Kelly appears in X-Men Origins: Wolverine, voiced by Steve Blum.

References

External links
 Senator Robert Kelly at Marvel.com

Characters created by Chris Claremont
Characters created by John Byrne (comics)
Comics characters introduced in 1980
Fictional characters from Kansas
Fictional characters from New York (state)
Fictional presidents of the United States
Fictional Republicans (United States)
Fictional United States senators
Marvel Comics film characters
Marvel Comics male characters
X-Men supporting characters